Highway 397 (AR 397 and Hwy. 397) is a former north–south state highway in Boone County, Arkansas. It was created by the Arkansas State Highway Commission on April 25, 1973, at the same meeting as the currently extant designation, between US 65 (now Highway 14) and the Missouri state line near Omaha. It was removed from the state highway system in exchange for an extension of Highway 123 at the request of the Boone County Judge.

Major intersections

See also

References

397
Transportation in Boone County, Arkansas